Dragonwings is a children's historical novel by Laurence Yep, published by Harper & Row in 1975. It inaugurated the Golden Mountain Chronicles (below) and it is the fifth chronicle in narrative sequence among ten published as of 2012. The book is used in school classrooms and has been adapted as a play under its original title.  Yep and Dragonwings won the Phoenix Award from the Children's Literature Association in 1995, recognizing the best children's book published twenty years earlier that did not win a major award. It had been a runner-up for the annual Newbery Medal.

Content
Dragonwings features the Chinese American experience in the United States, specifically San Francisco, shortly after the turn of the twentieth century.

The protagonist is Moon Shadow Lee, or in the Chinese order, Lee Moon Shadow. Moon Shadow grew up in China, having never seen his father, who had traveled to "The Golden Mountain" in America and worked hard in a family laundry which served the "white demons" (Americans). When Moon Shadow is nine (eight in American calculation), a distant relative, Hand Clap, returns to China for a visit and when Hand Clap returns to the United States, Moon Shadow goes with him. Moon Shadow is soon reunited with his father and receives a few wonderful gifts from his father, uncle, and new friend. From his uncle he receives a pair of new black leather boots. From his new friend he receives some trousers and a shirt. Finally, he receives a beautiful kite from his father, for whom kite making is a specialty. Moon Shadow found out that Windrider, his father, had a dream of a great dragon king. Windrider had found out he was a dragon in his former life and was determined to be worthy enough to again become a dragon. Moon Shadow supported and encouraged Windrider, even as they suffered hardships like the Great Earthquake, their poverty, and the gap between the Tang and white demons (Americans). He goes through situations with family and has to find his place in life.

Part of the story is based on an actual event that took place in 1909 involving a young Chinese flier named Fung Joe Guey.

Awards

The CLA Phoenix Award is named for the mythical bird phoenix, which is reborn from its ashes, to suggest the winning book's rise from obscurity during twenty years since its publication. But Dragonwings was not unrecognized in 1975. It was a runner-up (Honor Book) for both the American Library Association Newbery Medal, recognizing the year's best U.S. children's book, and the Boston Globe–Horn Book Award for children's fiction. It won an International Reading Association Children's Book Award and it made School Library Journal and The New York Times annual booklists.

Play 
Dragonwings was adapted as a stage play by the author in 1991, commissioned by Berkeley Repertory Theatre.  It premiered as a school tour in the San Francisco Bay Area and was directed by Phyllis S.K. Look.  The play was published by Dramatists Play Service in 1993.

Golden Mountain Chronicles

The family saga follows the Young family, initially in China. Dragons of Silk (2011) spans a few generations and brings the story to the present; nine previous novels have been dated 1849 to 1995.

 The Serpent's Children, set in 1849 (1984)
 Mountain Light, 1855 (1985)
 Dragon's Gate, 1867 (1993)
 The Traitor, 1885 (2003)
 Dragonwings, 1903 (1975) 
 Dragon Road, 1939 (2007); originally The Red Warrior
 Child of the Owl, 1960 (1977)
 Sea Glass, 1970 (1979)
 Thief of Hearts, 1995 (1995)
 Dragons of Silk, 1835–2011 (2011)

In order of year of publication: 
 Dragonwings, 1903 (1975) 
 Child of the Owl, 1960 (1977)
 Sea Glass, 1970 (1979)
 The Serpent's Children, set in 1849 (1984)
 Mountain Light, 1855 (1985)
 Dragon's Gate, 1867 (1993)
 Thief of Hearts, 1995 (1995)
 The Traitor, 1885 (2003)
 Dragon Road, 1939 (2007); originally The Red Warrior
 Dragons of Silk, 1835–2011 (2011)

Four of the ten historical novels are among Yep's five works most widely held in WorldCat libraries. Dragonwings and Dragon's Gate were runners-up for the Newbery Medal; Child of the Owl won the Horn Book Award.

See also

References

External links
"Dragonwings: Golden Mountain Chronicles: 1903" at HarperCollinsPublishers (with related material)
"Conversations with Yep and Soentpiet: Negotiationing between cultures: Establishing a multicultural identity through writing and illustrating". Marcia Baghban. The Dragon Lode 18.2 (Spring 2000) pp. 41–51. IRA.
Leimbach, Dulcie. "For Children." The New York Times. November 6, 1992. Online March 12, 2008.
ALA Newbery Medal & Honor Books, 1922-Present.

 Dragonwings Laurence Yep children's drama at Dramatists Play Service (abstract with script for sale)

Fiction set in 1903
1975 American novels
1975 children's books
American children's novels
American historical novels
Asian-American plays
Carter G. Woodson Book Award winners
Children's historical novels
Newbery Honor-winning works
Novels by Laurence Yep
Novels set in San Francisco
Wright brothers